Adair Creek is a stream in western Reynolds County in the Ozarks of southeast Missouri. It is a tributary of Logan Creek.

The source area lies just south of the junction of Missouri Route 72 and Missouri Route P about three miles southeast of Bunker. The stream flows south to southeast to its confluence with Logan Creek along Missouri Route B about 3.5 miles southwest of Reynolds.  About one mile upstream from its confluence the stream has been blocked with a dam and filled by mine tailings from the Adair Creek Mine (Sweetwater Mine).

Adair Creek has the name of one Mr. Adair, a local judge.

Course
Adair Creek rises about 5 miles southeast of Bunker, Missouri, in Reynolds County and then flows generally southeast to join Logan Creek about 3 miles southwest of Corridon.

Watershed
Adair Creek drains  of area, receives about 46.1 in/year of precipitation, has a wetness index of 404.02, and is about 77% forested.

See also
List of rivers of Missouri

References

Rivers of Reynolds County, Missouri
Rivers of Missouri